is a shoot'em up video game franchise developed and published by Bandai Namco Entertainment, formerly Namco. Some entries were outsourced to other developers, such as Hasbro Interactive, Bandai and Paladin Studios. The series first began in 1979 with the arcade game Galaxian, which was Namco's first major hit in the video game industry, seeing ports for multiple home consoles, handheld systems and mobile phones. Most games in the series have been fixed shooters, although some have delved into other genres such as rail shooters and twin-stick shooters. Entries in the franchise have been ported to several home consoles and included in many Namco video game compilations for multiple platforms. Galaxian is one of the most successful arcade games of its time, selling over 50,000 arcade cabinets in North America alone.

Galaxian and its sequel Galaga are cited as some of the most influential games of the genre, the latter being called one of the greatest video games ever made by many publications. Later entries in the series have been met with a more mixed reception — some, such as Galaga Legions and its DX update, have been praised for expanding upon the gameplay in earlier titles, while others, such as Galaga: Destination Earth, were criticized for being poor updates of the original. The success of the series has lend itself to other forms of media, including soundtrack CDs, apparel, garage kits and literature. Including re-releases, the Galaxian franchise has sold over 12 million copies, making it one of Bandai Namco's best-selling franchises of all time.

Arcade games

Home console and handheld games

Mobile games

Other titles

Notes

References

External links
Official website

Galaxian